Rhizoids are protuberances that extend from the lower epidermal cells of bryophytes and algae. They are similar in structure and function to the root hairs of vascular land plants. Similar structures are formed by some fungi. Rhizoids may be unicellular or multicellular.

Evolutionary development 
Plants originated in aquatic environments and gradually migrated to land during their long course of evolution. In water or near it, plants could absorb water from their surroundings, with no need for any special absorbing organ or tissue. Additionally, in the primitive states of plant development, tissue differentiation and division of labor was minimal, thus specialized water absorbing tissue was not required. The development of specialized tissues to absorb water efficiently and anchor themselves to the ground enabled the spread of plants to the land.

Description 
Rhizoids absorb water mainly by capillary action, in which water moves up between threads of rhizoids and not through each of them as it does in roots, but some species of bryophytes do have the ability to take up water inside their rhizoids.

Land plants 
In land plants, rhizoids are trichomes that anchor the plant to the ground. In the liverworts, they are absent or unicellular, but multicelled in mosses. In vascular plants they are often called root hairs, and may be unicellular or multicellular.

Algae 
In certain algae, there is an extensive rhizoidal system that allows the alga to anchor itself to a sandy substrate from which it can absorb nutrients. Microscopic free-floating species, however, do not have rhizoids at all.

Fungi 
In fungi, rhizoids are small branching hyphae that grow downwards from the stolons that anchor the fungus to the substrate, where they release digestive enzymes and absorb digested organic material. That is why fungí are called heterotrophs by absorption.

See also 

 Rhizine, the equivalent structure in lichens

References

Further reading

External links 
 
 

Fungal morphology and anatomy
Bryophytes
Plant anatomy

he:מורפולוגיה של הצמח - מונחים#איברים בצמחים פרימיטיביים